The Palong Tin Museum is a museum in Ipoh, Kinta District, Perak, Malaysia.

History
The establishment of the museum is part of tourism-related project undertook by Kinta Riverfront Hotel and Suites in collaboration with Ipoh City Council and Perak Water and Drainage Department, which also includes the beautification of Kinta River side landscape.

Exhibitions
The museum exhibits information on Malaysia mining history, Kinta Valley tin mining activities, mining methods etc.

See also
 List of museums in Malaysia
 List of tourist attractions in Perak
 Mining in Malaysia

References

1995 establishments in Malaysia
Buildings and structures in Ipoh
Mining museums
Museums established in 1995
Museums in Perak